Skilled Group is an Australian company headquartered in Melbourne, Victoria. Its core business is labour hire. It is a subsidiary of Programmed Maintenance, which is itself a subsidiary of Japanese labour hire conglomerate Persol Holdings.

The company manages offices across multiple countries; including Australia, New Zealand, United Kingdom, Malta and the United Arab Emirates.

Corporate history 
The company was founded in 1964 by Frank Hargrave AO.

In October 2015, Programmed Maintenance (ASX:PRG) acquired Skilled Group.

In October 2017, Programmed Maintenance was acquired by Persol Holdings.

Legal controversies 
In 2011, Telstra trainees took the company and its subsidiary Excelior to the industrial relations tribunal.  The union said that trainees were not compensated enough for expenses during mandatory training.

In 2015 in a landmark case, a couple was awarded damages of $720,000 against the company after being refused jobs for being non-union.

See also
 Labour brokering
 Recruitment
 Temporary work

References

External links
 

Australian companies established in 1964
Companies based in Melbourne
Business services companies established in 1964
Companies formerly listed on the Australian Securities Exchange
Temporary employment agencies